Reginald Osborne (born Wynberg, Cape Colony 23 July 1898, died 1977) was a professional footballer who played as a full back for Leicester City in the 1920s. Born in South Africa, he also made one appearance for England.

Playing career
During his career at Leicester he made a total of 249 appearances and was a member of the side which won the Second Division title in 1925. His solitary England appearance came in a 2–1 defeat by Wales on 28 November 1927, in which there were two own goals and a missed penalty (by Roy Goodall).

Family
Reg had two brothers who also played in the Football League. Harold made one appearance for Norwich City whilst Frank was a centre-forward with Fulham, Tottenham Hotspur and Southampton, who made four England appearances.

Honours
Leicester City
Football League Second Division champions: 1924-25

See also
 List of England international footballers born outside England

References

External links
 

1898 births
1977 deaths
Sportspeople from Cape Town
English footballers
England international footballers
South African soccer players
South African people of English descent
Bromley F.C. players
Leicester City F.C. players
Folkestone F.C. players
Association football fullbacks